Raman Sharma (5 September 1945 – 6 January 1999) was an Indian cricket umpire. He stood in one Test match in 1994 and eleven ODI games between 1993 and 1997. Sharma died when the jeep he was driving collided with a bus in 1999.

See also
 List of Test cricket umpires
 List of One Day International cricket umpires

References

1945 births
1999 deaths
Place of birth missing
Indian Test cricket umpires
Indian One Day International cricket umpires
Road incident deaths in India